Neoglyphidodon crossi is a species of damselfish found in the western and central Pacific. It occasionally makes its way into the aquarium trade.

Distribution and habitat
Neoglyphidodon crossi is found in mostly in the Pacific Ocean. It is found around Indonesia, the Philippines, and Papua New Guinea. Usually, they are found in coral reefs.

Description
They have 13 dorsal spines, 14 to 16 dorsal soft rays, 2 anal spines, and 13 to 14 anal soft rays. Juveniles are orange with a black bottom and a blue line that extends from its snout to its caudal pentacle. Adults are more grayish with less orange spots and their line is less blue.

Ecology

Diet
This fish is omnivorous.

Behaviour
Adults of this species are solitary.

In the aquarium
This fish is found in the aquarium trade.

Breeding
Females lay into the substrate. The males then guard and aerate the eggs until they hatch.

References

External links
 

crossi
Fish described in 1991